Babatunde Rahim, known professionally as Lyta, is a Nigerian singer. He signed a record deal with YBNL Nation in 2018 but left the label in May 2019 after having a disagreement with the label owner Olamide. He released the 5-track debut EP Id in 2019.

Early life and career 
A native of Kwara State, Lyta grew up in Ajegunle and was a member of Ile Kewu, a music group at his local mosque. His record deal with YBNL Nation was made public on 3 February 2018. In 2019, Lyta confirmed that he did not have any written contracts with YBNL Nation. Lyta's breakthrough single with YBNL Nation, "Time", features vocals by Olamide and was released on 14 February 2018.

In 2019, Lyta left YBNL Nation due to contractual and personal issues. After exiting YBNL, he signed with Doro Musik Gang and released the Killer Tunes-produced track "Monalisa" on 12 July 2019. The visuals for "Monalisa", which was directed by Director K, amassed over 500,000 views within a month after its release.

A few weeks after the release of "Monalisa", Davido reached out to Lyta about recording an official remix with him. Following their agreement, Davido and Lyta flew to Dakar for the remix and video shoot. The remix of "Monalisa" was released on 30 August 2019. Elias Light of Rolling Stone magazine described the song as a "handsome contradiction, with fierce expressions of yearning". The accompanying music video for the remix was directed by Director K.  Lyta gained exposure following his collaboration with Davido on the remix.

Lyta released the Afrobeat track "Worry" on 6 December 2019; it was produced by Killer Tunes. The visuals for "Worry" was shot and directed by Simplicity Visual Studios in London.

YBNL exit 
Reports about Lyta's exit from YBNL surfaced after Olamide unfollowed him on Instagram. In May 2019, Lyta confirmed his exit from YNBL Nation on Naijaloaded TV. He said although he was paid between 50,000 and 80,000 for shows, he never had a written contract with the label. Olamide issued a statement to Guardian Life, saying YBNL has a promotion calendar that Lyta refused to follow.

New record label 
In 2020, Lyta was signed to Marlian Records owned by Naira Marley. He also released his first single under the label titled "Hold me Down(Omo Gidi)". The video to "Hold Me Down", which was inspired by Kpop Korean boy band GOT7 and BTS, was directed by TG Omori.  The video is an exact replica of GOT7's "Just Right" music video.  However, Lyta did not ask for permission and K-pop fans were furious about the exact copy of the video. Lyta said, "I am not signed with Marlian records. Naira Marley is just showing me love."

Discography

EPs 
 Id (2019)

Singles 
  Time  (2018)
  Self made  (2018)
  Worry  (2019)
  Monalisa  (2018)
  Mama  (2020) 
 Hold me down  (2020)
Everybody (2020)
Ramadan (2020)
Birthday Wish (2020)
Hold Me Down (Omo Gidi) (2020)
Are You Sure (2021)
As lead artist

As featured artist

Awards and nominations

References 

Living people
Nigerian male singer-songwriters
Nigerian child singers
Nigerian male pop singers
English-language singers from Nigeria
Yoruba-language singers
Musicians from Lagos
21st-century Nigerian male singers
Year of birth missing (living people)